Jan van Schijndel (4 March 192728 February 2011) was a Dutch football player.

Club career
A one-club man, van Schijndel has played his entire career for SVV in Schiedam, with whom he won the 1949 Dutch league title and the first Dutch Supercup. He was one of the last surviving players of that title-winning squad.

International career
Van Schijndel made his debut for the Netherlands in a March 1949 friendly match against Belgium and had earned a total of 17 caps, scoring one goal. He captained the Netherlands in his last three games. He was a non-playing squad member for his country at the 1952 Summer Olympics.

His final international was an April 1955 friendly match, also against Belgium.

International goals
Scores and results list the Netherlands' goal tally first.

Death
Van Schijndel died on 28 February 2011 at the age of 83.

References

External links
 

1927 births
2011 deaths
Footballers from Schiedam
Association football midfielders
Dutch footballers
Netherlands international footballers
Footballers at the 1952 Summer Olympics
Olympic footballers of the Netherlands
SV SVV players
Eerste Divisie players